Lindsay Seidel is an American voice actress, mostly known for her work in the dubbing of various anime series in English. Some of her noteworthy roles include Nagisa Shiota in Assassination Classroom and Gabi Braun in the final season of Attack on Titan.  Other major roles include: Mira Konohata in Asteroid in Love, Nejire Hado in My Hero Academia, Meme Tatane in Soul Eater Not!, Kino in Kino's Journey, Eto Yoshimura in Tokyo Ghoul, Belfast in Azur Lane, Vanica Zogratis in Black Clover, Maya Fey in the Ace Attorney TV series, and Pochita in Chainsaw Man.

Biography
Seidel started voice acting professionally at the age of 10 years old, where she voiced lines for use in a Japanese to English textbook. In 2015, she was awarded voice actress of the year by the Behind the Voice Actors website. In 2020, Seidel attended both MCM London Comic Con and SacAnime as a guest of honor. As of January 2020, she is based in Dallas.

Filmography

Anime

Films

Video games

Live-action

Marriage and family 
Lindsay Seidel Fleming and Jacob Fleming were married on August 1, 2020, at the Morton H. Meyerson Symphony Center in Dallas. The couple met as President’s Scholars at SMU. Jacob was a second-year medical student at Vanderbilt University School of Medicine when they married. He is now a Radiology resident, and an aspiring spine and Musculoskeletal Interventional Radiologist at UT Southwestern. Also, he is host at BackTable VI Podcast.

In September 2021, she gave birth to her and her husband's son Elliot. They have a Corgi.

References

External links
 
 
 
 
 

21st-century American actresses
American film actresses
American television actresses
American voice actresses
Living people
1991 births